"Cheremshyna" is a Ukrainian-language song-romance. The song was first released in 1965, with music by Vasyl Mykhailyuk and lyrics by Mykola Yuriychuk. The first performer of the song was Dmytro Hnatyuk.

Cheremshyna is a name for the Prunus padus (Bird Cherry) in the Ukrainian language.

Mykola Yuriychuk previously worked at mining pits in Jezkazgan, Kazakhstan, but after receiving disability in 1964 returned home to Bukovinian city of Vashkivtsi. At home Yuriychuk wrote lyrics to the future song without any prior expectations and gave them away to his friend Mykhailyuk as if those lyrics might be useful someday. The lyrics were put away in a box and were left there for year, when in 1965 after taking walk in meadows Mykhailyuk came up with a melody. He ran to his house, sat down at his piano, played the melody out, and then quickly wrote down notes on a paper.

Vasyl Mykhailyuk mentioned that in 1965 he with chorus traveled to Kyiv to celebrate the 25th anniversary of the integration of Northern Bukovina into Ukraine and there Dmytro Hnatiuk heard the song. He gave wings to the song and thankfully to him the song flew around the world.

Among other performers are Sofia Rotaru, Taisia Povaliy (Ukraine), Kvitka Cisyk (United States), Stepan Pasicznyk (UK), Evdokimov Yaroslav Alexandrovich (Russia), Tatiana Bulanova, Aleksandr Malinin (Russia), and many others.

The song was included in Kvitka Cisyk's album Two Colors.

According to recollections of FC Karpaty Lviv players, the song was inspiring when it sounded over the stadium in Moscow in 1969.<ref>Levkivskyi, A. The today's "Karpaty" is not that team that must be in such city (Нинішні “Карпати” – не та команда, яка має бути в такому місті). Lvivska Hazeta. 27 June 2007</ref>

The lyrics of the song mention Cheremosh River.

References

External links
 Ukrainian folk songs
 Masliy, M. Daughter of Vasyl Mykhailiuk, author of Cheremshyna: "Dad was telling that while writing the music, he was thinking about mom in a wedding dress''. Fakty (interview). 9 July 2015
 
 
 
 
 
 
 Song's lyrics poetic translation to English

Dmytro Hnatyuk songs
Ukrainian songs
1965 songs